Marion Delmar Ritchie (1875 – May 24, 1916) was an American football coach and physician.  He served as the head football coach at Franklin & Marshall College in Lancaster, Pennsylvania for one season, in 1898, compiling a record of 4–4–2.

Ritchie was born in Philadelphia, Pennsylvania in 1875.  A native of Harrisburg, Pennsylvania, he played college football as a halfback at Dickinson College in 1893. 
Ritchie also attended Lafayette College before graduating from the Perelman School of Medicine at the University of Pennsylvania in 1899.  Thereafter he practiced medicine in Pittsburgh, Pennsylvania. Ritchie died at his home in Pittsburgh on May 24, 1916.

Head coaching record

References

External links
 

1875 births
1916 deaths
19th-century players of American football
American football halfbacks
Dickinson Red Devils football players
Gettysburg Bullets football coaches
Franklin & Marshall Diplomats football coaches
Vermont Catamounts football coaches
Dickinson College alumni
Lafayette College alumni
Perelman School of Medicine at the University of Pennsylvania alumni
Sportspeople from Harrisburg, Pennsylvania
Sportspeople from Philadelphia
Physicians from Pennsylvania
Players of American football from Harrisburg, Pennsylvania
Players of American football from Philadelphia